The 2017 Shepherd Rams football team represented Shepherd University during the 2017 NCAA Division II football season as a member of the Mountain East Conference (MEC). They were led by head coach Monte Cater, in his 31st and final season at Shepherd, and finished the season 10–1. With a conference record of 10–0, they were named MEC champions for the third straight year and advanced to the Division II Playoffs, losing in the first round to Findlay. The Rams played their home games at Ram Stadium in Shepherdstown, West Virginia.

This was also the final season for senior quarterback Connor Jessop, who briefly signed with the Washington Redskins practice squad during the 2018 NFL season.

Preseason
After finishing the 2016 season with a record of 13–1, with the only loss coming in the semifinals to North Alabama, the Rams were ranked #7 in the preseason poll.

Regular season
The 2017 regular season for the Rams consisted of 10 games against Mountain East Conference foes. The Rams went undefeated in the regular season and were given the second seed in Super Region I in the 2017 NCAA Division II football playoffs.

Playoffs
Despite going undefeated in the regular season and finishing #2 in the country, the Rams hosted a game in the first round of the playoffs, against seventh-seeded Findlay. This was Findlay's first ever postseason appearance (in the NCAA,) and they defeated Shepherd 29–17 in what was considered an upset.

Schedule

References

Shepherd Rams football seasons
2017 in sports in West Virginia